Aghcheh, also rendered as Aghjeh and Aqjeh, may refer to various places in Iran:
 Aghcheh, Isfahan
 Aghcheh, Kerman
 Aghcheh Bolagh
 Aghcheh Bughaz
 Aghcheh Darband
 Aghcheh Dizaj (disambiguation)
 Aghjeh Dizaj (disambiguation)
 Aqcheh Qaleh (disambiguation)
 Aghcheh Hesar
 Aghcheh Kandi
 Aghcheh Kohel (disambiguation)
 Aghcheh Kohol
 Aghcheh Mashhad (disambiguation)
 Aghcheh Mazar
 Aghcheh Qaleh
 Aghcheh Qayah
 Aghcheh Qeshlaq (disambiguation)
 Aghcheh Rish (disambiguation)
 Aghcheh Rud
 Aghcheh Ziveh

See also
 Aghjeh, Iran
 Aqcheh (disambiguation), various places in Iran